Dragan Čović (born 20 August 1956) is a Bosnian Croat politician who served as the 4th Croat member of the Presidency of Bosnia and Herzegovina from 2002 to 2005 and from 2014 to 2018. He is the current president of the Croatian Democratic Union and is a member of the national House of Peoples.

Born in Mostar, Čović graduated from the Faculty of Engineering at University Džemal Bijedić in his hometown in 1979. He also attended studies at the University of Sarajevo and holds a PhD University of Mostar, obtaining it in 1996. Prior to the Bosnian War, Čović worked as a manager at Yugoslav aircraft manufacturer SOKO. He entered into politics by joining the Croatian Democratic Union in 1994, becoming its president in 2005. As president of the Croatian Democratic Union, he took part in many constitutional reform talks, most notably in those regarding the Prud Agreement between 2008 and 2009, and in the 2010–2012 government formation.

Earlier in his career, Čović served as Federal Minister of Finance from 1998 to 2001 and was the acting Federal Prime Minister in 2001. At the 2002 general election, Čović was elected Croat member of the Bosnian Presidency, serving as its member until 2005, when he was removed from office by High Representative Paddy Ashdown, for abuse of power and position. After serving a term in the national House of Peoples from 2011 to 2014, he was once again elected Croat member of the Presidency at the 2014 general election. Čović served as member until 2018, after losing his bid for re-election at the 2018 general election. Since 2019, he has again been serving as member of the national House of Peoples.

In November 2006, Čović was sentenced to five years in prison for exempting the Ivanković-Lijanović company of paying taxes on meat imports. The Bosnian Court, on appeal, annulled the sentence and acquitted him for lack of jurisdiction. In 2009, he was accused of spending public funds to buy private homes for certain people. In April 2010, he was acquitted. In May 2010, a third indictment for Čović and six other persons was confirmed by the Court of the Herzegovina-Neretva Canton, this time for abuse of power and position. In May 2012, he was acquitted.

Education and managerial career
Čović attended elementary school and technical high school of mechanical engineering in Mostar until 1975. He graduated as a mechanical engineer from the Faculty of Engineering at the University Džemal Bijedić of Mostar in 1979.

In 1980, he joined the aircraft manufacturer SOKO in Mostar, where he worked in technology and control sections. From 1986 to 1992, Čović was a manager at SOKO, including as director of business unit, director of production and vice president for industrialization. From 1992 until 1998, he took over as director-general of SOKO.

Čović gained a master's degree in 1989 at the Faculty of Engineering in Mostar, and, from 1989 to 1991, he attended studies of management at the Faculty of Economy at the University of Sarajevo. He obtained a PhD from the University of Mostar in 1996.

From 1994 to 1996, he taught Economics and Organization of Production as a senior assistant at the Faculty of Engineering in Mostar, after which he was named assistant professor and taught Development of Production Systems. Four years later, Čović became an associate professor and in 2004 he was a full professor of the University of Mostar. He worked at the Faculty of Economy in Mostar, and also in regular and postgraduate studies. In 2007, he became visiting professor at the University of Mostar's Faculty of Philosophy, and in 2014 member of the Croatian Academy of Sciences and Arts of Bosnia and Herzegovina.

Early political career
In 1994, Čović joined the Croatian Democratic Union (HDZ BiH). Two years later, he became a member of the cantonal committee of the HDZ BiH. In 1997, he became the president of the city committee of the HDZ BiH in Mostar.

In 1998, Čović became vice president of the HDZ BiH, while in 2002, he became the party's presidency member. In 2005, he was elected HDZ BiH president. From 1998 to 2001, Čović served as the Federal Minister of Finance. From 10 January 2001 to 12 March 2001, he served as Acting Prime Minister of the Federation of Bosnia and Herzegovina, succeeding the Party of Democratic Action's Edhem Bičakčić. Čović served as Acting Prime Minister for two months, before he himself got succeeded by Alija Behmen of the Social Democratic Party.

First presidency (2002–2005)
At the 2002 general election, Čović was elected member of the Presidency of Bosnia and Herzegovina with 114,606 votes. He served as Presidency member until 29 March 2005, when he was removed from office by the High Representative for Bosnia and Herzegovina, Paddy Ashdown, for abuse of power and position.

Post-presidency (2005–2014)

Since 2005, Čović has been President of the Croatian Democratic Union (HDZ BiH).

In May 2011, he became a member of the national House of Peoples and in February 2012, he was named Chairman of the House of Peoples. Čović would chair the House once more in 2014. In 2011, he was also appointed President of the Croatian National Assembly.

During the numerous failed negotiations to implement the 2009 ECtHR Sejdić-Finci judgment, Čović has been singled out by analysts as blocking a solution, maintaining that Bosnian Croats must be able to elect their own member in the Presidency.

Prud Agreement

Together with the leaders of the three most important 'nationalist' political parties in Bosnia and Herzegovina, who acted as representatives of the constituent peoples, Milorad Dodik of the Alliance of Independent Social Democrats (SNSD) and Sulejman Tihić of the Party of Democratic Action, Čović created the Prud Agreement or Prud Process, an agreement that pertained to state property, census, constitutional changes, reconstructing the Council of Ministers of Bosnia and Herzegovina and solving the legal status of Brčko District. The agreement was created in the village of Prud on 8 November 2008. The reforms promised by the agreement would "build the ability of the State to meet the requirements of the EU integration process".

At a subsequent meeting in Banja Luka on 26 January 2009, the party leaders set out a plan for Bosnia and Herzegovina as a decentralized country with three levels of government. The middle level of government was anticipated to be made up by four territorial units with legislative, executive and judicial branches of government.

Controversy surrounded the creation of a third entity, Republika Srpska’s territorial integrity, and the division of Bosnia and Herzegovina.

A further meeting was held in Mostar on 23 February 2009, hosted by Čović.

On 20 July 2009, the High Representative for Bosnia and Herzegovina, Valentin Inzko suggested that the process between the three 'nationalist' parties had effectively ended. Instead it had changed into a process involving many more political parties. Inzko believed that minor level constitutional reform can be delivered through the meetings.

When the Prud process failed, Milorad Dodik and his SNSD party became close partners to Čović's HDZ BiH party.

2010–2012 government formation

Following the 2010 general election, a process of formation of Bosnia and Herzegovina's Council of Ministers (i.e. the national government) had begun. The resulting election produced a fragmented political landscape without a coalition of a parliamentary majority more than a year after the election. The centre-left Social Democratic Party (SDP BiH), and the Bosnian Serb autonomist SNSD, each had 8 MPs of the total 42 MPs of the House of Representatives.

The major Croat (HDZ BiH and HDZ 1990) and Serb parties (SNSD and SDS) contended that a gentlemen's agreement existed in which the chairmanship of the Council of Ministers rotates between the three constitutional nationalities. In this case, it would be the turn for a Croat politician to chair the Council. As the Croatian Democratic Union (HDZ BiH), led by Čović, and the Croatian Democratic Union 1990 (HDZ 1990) received the overwhelming share of Croat votes at the 2010 general election, the parties demanded that a member of one of them receive the position of Chairman. The SDP BiH on the other hand, claimed that the only necessity is the ethnicity of the individual, and not the party, demanding the right to appoint a Croat Chairman from SDP BiH ranks, calling upon the right of having assumed most votes nationwide.

The European Union and the Office of the High Representative repeatedly attempted negotiations to appease the Bosniak–Bosnian and Serb–Croat divided political blocs, in parallel to the Bosnian constitutional crisis, all ending in failure. The Bosniak-Bosnian coalition insisted that the seat would have to go to them as the party that received the largest number of votes, while the Serb–Croat alliance insisted that due to the fact that according to tradition, the next Chairman of the Council of Ministers must be an ethnic Croat, it must come from an authentic Croat party (Croatian Democratic Union), and not the multi-ethnic SDP BiH.

A round of talks between party leaders was held in Mostar on 5 September 2011, hosted by Croat politicians Božo Ljubić and Čović, with Milorad Dodik, Mladen Bosić, Sulejman Tihić and Zlatko Lagumdžija in attendance. The parties agreed to a further round of discussion in mid-September. A meeting between the six major party leaders was held in Sarajevo on 15 September, hosted by Zlatko Lagumdžija. Topics discussed at the meeting included holding a national census, military assets and the Sejdić-Finci ruling. On the same day, an EU spokesperson warned that the country risked losing funding through the Instrument for Pre-Accession Assistance if the political situation did not stabilize. Another meeting on 26 September 2011 failed as well.

An agreement was finally reached on 28 December 2011 between the six political parties: the Social Democratic Party, the Party of Democratic Action (SDA), the Croatian Democratic Union, the Croatian Democratic Union 1990, the Serb Democratic Party and the Alliance of Independent Social Democrats. Vjekoslav Bevanda, a Bosnian Croat, became the new Chairman of the Council of Ministers.

Constitutional reform

As “credible efforts” towards the implementation of the Sejdić–Finci ruling remained the outstanding condition for the entry into force of the Stabilisation and Association Agreement, in June 2012, Czech Commissioner Štefan Füle launched a High Level Dialogue on the Accession Process (HLAD) with Bosnia and Herzegovina, tackling both the Sejdić–Finci issue and the need for a coordination mechanism for the country to speak with a single voice in the accession process. Talks were held in June and November 2012, with little success.

In the summer of 2012, Čović and SDP BiH leader Lagumdžija agreed on the indirect election of the Bosnian Presidency members by the Bosnian Parliament, but the deal was not turned into detailed amendments. The HDZ BiH kept calling for electoral reform to prevent new Komšić cases. The same Željko Komšić left the SDP BiH, in dissent with the agreement which would have excluded him from acceding to power again. The SDA also opposed it, as it would have created a further asymmetry, with one Presidency member (from Republika Srpska) elected directly, and two elected indirectly.

In February 2013, the European Commission decided to step up its involvement, with the direct facilitation of talks by Füle, in coordination with the Council of Europe's Secretary-General Thorbjørn Jagland. In March and April 2013, with the support of the Director-General for Enlargement Stefano Sannino, the EU Delegation in Sarajevo facilitated a series of direct talks between party leaders, with no concrete outcome.

During the summer of 2013, Čović and Bosnian Presidency member Bakir Izetbegović reached a political agreement on several files, from Mostar to Sejdić–Finci, in parallel to the initiative led by the U.S. Embassy for a constitutional reform of the Federal entity. An agreement on principles on how to solve the Sejdić–Finci issue was signed by political leaders in Brussels on 1 October 2013, but it evaporated right after. Three further rounds of negotiations among political leaders were led together with Štefan Füle, in a castle near Prague in November 2013, and later in Sarajevo in the first months of 2014, also with the presence of the U.S. and the Venice Commission. Despite high hopes, a solution could not be found, as the HDZ BiH required the absolute arithmetical certainty of being able to occupy the third seat of the Bosnian Presidency – which, given that the Sejdić–Finci ruling was actually about removing ethnic discrimination in the access to the same Presidency, could not be provided by any possible model. Talks were ended on 17 February 2014, while popular protests were ongoing in Sarajevo and in the rest of the country.

Second presidency (2014–2018)

At the 2014 general election, Čović was re-elected as Croat member of the Presidency of Bosnia and Herzegovina. He chaired the Presidency between November 2015 and March 2016, during which period on 15 February 2016, Bosnia and Herzegovina submitted its EU membership application. Čović held again the chair of the Presidency in the July–November 2017 period.

On 7 June 2015, he met with Pope Francis in Sarajevo, as part of the Popes's 2015 papal visit to Bosnia and Herzegovina.

At the 2018 general election, Čović lost his bid for re-election as Croat member of the Bosnian Presidency to Željko Komšić (former member of Presidency from 2006 until 2014). He and the HDZ BiH accused Komšić to garner support from Bosniak rather than Croat voters and thus not to be a legitimate representative of Bosnian Croats in the country's Presidency.

Investigations and indictments

In November 2006, Čović was sentenced to five years in prison for exempting the Ivanković-Lijanović company of paying taxes on meat imports. The Court of Bosnia and Herzegovina, on appeal, annulled the sentence and acquitted him for lack of jurisdiction.

In 2009, Čović was accused of spending public funds to buy private homes for certain people. In April 2010, he was acquitted.

On 14 May 2010, a third indictment for Čović and six other persons was confirmed by the Court of the Herzegovina-Neretva Canton, this time for abuse of power and position. He and other committee members of the Croatian Post and Telecom (HPT) were accused of transferring a debt of nearly 4,7 million convertible marks from the non-existing Ministry of Defence of the Croatian Defence Council to three private companies. By receiving the debt, those three companies became owners of shares in HT Eronet, the most profitable telecommunicational section of the HPT. At the time, Čović was Federal Minister of Finance and president of the Steering Committee of the HPT. The Court of the HNC asked that this case be brought in front of the Court of Bosnia and Herzegovina, but the Federal Supreme Court ruled the case had to be tried in Mostar. In May 2012, Čović was acquitted.

In March 2021, Čović was sanction by the Conflict of Interest Commission of Bosnia and Herzegovina with a reduction of 10% of his parliamentary salary for violation of the Law on Conflict of Interest, as in 2017 he received double compensation, both as member of the national House of Peoples and of the Croatian National Assembly.

Personal life
Čović is married to Bernardica Prskalo and together they have two children.

On 19 July 2020, it was confirmed that he tested positive for COVID-19, amid its pandemic in Bosnia and Herzegovina; by 4 August, he recovered.

References

External links

CIN - imovina politicara - Dragan Čović

1956 births
Living people
Politicians from Mostar
Croats of Bosnia and Herzegovina
Croatian Democratic Union of Bosnia and Herzegovina politicians
Prime ministers of the Federation of Bosnia and Herzegovina
Members of the House of Peoples of Bosnia and Herzegovina
Chairmen of the House of Peoples of Bosnia and Herzegovina
Chairmen of the Presidency of Bosnia and Herzegovina
Members of the Presidency of Bosnia and Herzegovina
Heads of government who were later imprisoned